Walter Richard Cassels (4 September 1826 – 10 June 1907) was an English poet and theological critic best known as the author of Supernatural Religion (1874).

Early life
Cassels was born in London, the son of a British consular official. In the 1850s, he published two volumes of poetry, and spent three years in Italy, where he befriended the poets Robert and Elizabeth Browning. He later became a partner with two of his brothers in the firm of Peel, Cassels & Co. in Bombay, India. In 1862, he published a monograph on the Bombay cotton industry. After serving on the Legislative Council of Bombay from 1863 to 1865, Cassels returned to England.

Supernatural Religion
In 1874, Cassels published an anonymous two-volume work entitled Supernatural Religion: An Inquiry into the Reality of Divine Revelation, in which he challenged the credibility of miracles and the validity of the New Testament. The work at once attracted attention, and resulted in much speculation about the identity of the anonymous author. Many books and articles were written in response to the criticism of Christianity made in Supernatural Religion. The most famous of these rebuttals is a series of essays by Bishop , which were subsequently collected and published as a book. In 1877, a third volume was added to Supernatural Religion, and a fully revised edition was published in 1879. A series of anonymous replies to Bishop Lightfoot and other critics appeared in magazine articles and as footnotes or prefaces to reprints of Supernatural Religion. These replies were also compiled as a book in 1889. Abridged popular editions of Supernatural Religion in a single volume were published in 1902 and 1905.

Later life
News of Cassels' authorship of Supernatural Religion began to leak out in 1895, after he published a series of signed articles on theology. However, Cassels never publicly acknowledged his authorship of Supernatural Religion. Little is known about his private life, or of how he acquired his extensive knowledge of early Christianity. It is known that he collected art and was a Fellow of the Royal Photographic Society. He never married and died in London on 10 June 1907.

Works
 Eidolon, or the Course of a Soul; and other poems. William Pickering: London, 1850.
 Poems. Smith, Elder & Co.: London, 1856.
 Cotton: An Account of its Culture in the Bombay Presidency. 1862.

Published anonymously 

 Supernatural Religion: An Inquiry into the Reality of Divine Revelation.
Longmans & Co.: London, 1874 (Volumes I and II). Six editions, 1874-1876. Volume III, 1877.
Complete Edition (3 vols), 1879.
Popular edition (in 1 volume), 1902, Watts & Co. (Reprinted 1905.)
A Reply to Dr. Lightfoot's Essays. Longmans & Co.: London, 1889.
The Gospel according to Peter: A Study. Longmans & Co.: London, 1894.

References

Bibliography

Tracks of a Rolling Stone (1905), Henry J. Coke.
"Matthew Arnold and 'The Author of Supernatural Religion': The Background to God and the Bible", by Jerold J. Savory. SEL: Studies in English Literature 1500–1900, Autumn 1976 (Vol 16 no 4), pp. 677–91.
"Male Diagnosis of the Female Pen in Late Victorian Britain: Private Assessments of Supernatural Religion", by Alan H. Cadwallader. Journal of Anglican Studies, Vol. 5, No. 1, pp. 69–88 (2007).

External links 
 Supernatural Religion: An Inquiry into the Reality of Divine Revelation (online text of 1902 reprint)
 
 
 
 

1826 births
1907 deaths
19th-century English theologians
British biblical scholars
Criticism of the Bible
Fellows of the Royal Photographic Society
Members of the Bombay Legislative Council
Writers from London